The men's heavyweight competition in sumo at the 2009 World Games took place on 17 July 2009 at the Kaohsiung Senior High School Gymnasium in Kaohsiung, Taiwan.

Competition format
A total of 16 athletes entered the competition. They fought in the cup system with repechages.

Results

Main draw

Repechages

Semifinals

Finals

References